Shane Beschen (born February 18, 1972) is a California (USA) born professional surfer.

In 1996, at Kirra, Shane Beschen became the first and only professional surfer to score three perfect 10 point rides for a total 30 out of 30 ASP three-wave scoring system.

In May 2005 in the final of the Billabong Pro Teahupoo, Kelly Slater became the first to score two perfect rides for a total 20 out of 20 under the newer ASP two-wave scoring system, matched by Joel Parkinson in the 2008 Billabong Pipeline Masters third-round heats.

References

Sources
Shane Beschen Interview
Influences: Shane Beschen

1972 births
American surfers
World Surf League surfers
Living people